The Athletic Ground also known as Cobridge Stadium was a football stadium and greyhound racing stadium, located in Cobridge, Stoke-on-Trent.

Football
The ground was home to Port Vale for 27 years, hosting twelve Football League seasons.

It was located opposite the church on Waterloo Road, directly on the Hanley and Burslem tram line. The seven-acre site was obtained from the Sandbach Charity on a 21-year lease. It was surrounded by a 430-yard cinder track for athletics and cycling, hence the name. On the north side was a 1,000 capacity grandstand, along with three shower baths and a gymnasium.

They left the stadium for The Old Recreation Ground in 1913, and it was demolished in the 1980s after decades of use for amateur football. A Mercedes garage was later built near the site.

Greyhound Racing

Origins
In 1932 a Glasgow company called Albion Greyhounds affiliated to the National Greyhound Racing Society formed Albion Greyhounds (Stoke) Ltd by raising £40,000 capital in £1 shares. A greyhound track and associated facilities were constructed around the pitch and would become the second track in Stoke-on-Trent to open after Hanley Greyhound Stadium.

Opening
Racing got underway on 19 July 1932 at 7.30pm with W.W.Colonel Dobson waving the flag for the first race, the winner was Silent Marble, a one length winner from The Padre in a time of 29.50 secs over 480 yards. All races were over 480 yards with winners times ranging from 28.65 to 30.29. The all-electric totalisator consisted of 31 issuing machines. General Manager Brigadier-General Frank Logan decided not to have track bookmakers, a decision which would backfire when the government restricted the use of them later in the year.

Pre war history
The ban on totes forced the track to close its doors for three months before re-opening with track bookmakers in December 1932. Racing would be held on Friday and Saturday evenings with former Albion Glasgow Racing Manager Major J.S.Woolley taking up the same position at Stoke.

Post war history
After the war the circuit was 428 yards in circumference with long 125 yard straights and a good run-up but bends were described as very sharp. The Outside M.S Cable hare system was in operation with distances of 280, 500 and 650 yards being used. The north covered stand was called the popular enclosure and had a licensed club next to it and there was also a smaller south covered stand with an enclosure separating a further covered popular enclosure and licensed club. Unusually the hare control was between the first and second bends but the small judge's box was directly next to the winning line. The racing kennels were well back behind a third covered popular enclosure on the third bend and the 250 resident kennels were situated in countryside surroundings at Trentham, seven miles from the stadium.

First Closure
Attendances during the 1950s in the area had decreased resulting in the closure of the stadium by the Albion Greyhound company. The final meeting was on 1 October 1954.

Re-Opening and final closure
The stadium had remained intact and was used as a sports stadium afterwards. It seemed unlikely that greyhound racing would return following the start of greyhound racing at the nearby Chesterton Greyhound Stadium in 1975. However a company called Aclecourt Ltd re-opened the stadium to independent racing (unaffiliated to a governing body) on 24 July 1982. After another closure a further reopening took place during April 1985 by the Andrews family.

The lease would change hands several times before the council sold the site for housing in 1991 with the last meeting held on 17 September 1991. The redevelopment included the Greyhound Way and Stadium Court.

Track records

Midget Car Racing
A dirt track staging Midget car or "Speedway Car" racing ran from June 1939 for around two months before the outbreak of the second world war seemingly replacing the racing at Stoke's Hanley stadium.
The opening meeting at Cobridge was on 29 June 1939.  The short lived team were called the Cobridge Tigers.

References

Sports venues completed in 1886
Defunct football venues in England
Demolished buildings and structures in England
Port Vale F.C.
Sports venues in Stoke-on-Trent
English Football League venues
Defunct greyhound racing venues in the United Kingdom
Sports venues demolished in 1991